Colin Morris (4 February 1916 – 31 March 1996) was a British playwright, screenwriter and actor.  His best known work was the screen version of Reluctant Heroes (1951) based on his own play. As an actor, he appeared in the 1957 film The Silken Affair. Reluctant Heroes premiered in 1950 at the Whitehall Theatre, and was the first of the Brian Rix company's Whitehall farces.

Other plays of Morris's include:
 Desert Rats (1945)
 Woman at Large (English Theatre Guild, 1950)
 The Terrible Crime of Mr Bat (children's drama; Samuel French, 1950)
 Don't Bank On It
 Missing, Believed Married (English Theatre Guild, 1951)
 Italian Love Story (English Theatre Guild, 1955)
 This Marriage Business (English Theatre Guild, 1956)

Published screenplays include:
 Quiet Revolution (documentary drama)

References

External links

Entry for Morris in the Doolee theatrical database
 

1916 births
1996 deaths
British male screenwriters
20th-century British dramatists and playwrights
British male dramatists and playwrights
20th-century British male writers
20th-century British screenwriters